Pearsall may refer to:

Pearsall (surname)
Pearsall, Texas, an American city
Pearsall, Western Australia, an Australian suburb

See also
West Pearsall, Texas
Fort Pearsall, an 18th-century fort in Romney, West Virginia